The 2001–02 Australian Athletics Championships was the 80th edition of the national championship in outdoor track and field for Australia. It was held from 11–14 April 2002 at the Queensland Sport and Athletics Centre in Brisbane. It served as a selection meeting for Australia at the 2002 Commonwealth Games. The 5000 metres events were held separately in Melbourne on 7 March 2002.

Medal summary

Men

Women

References

External links 
 Athletics Australia website

2002
Australian Athletics Championships
Australian Championships
Athletics Championships
Sports competitions in Brisbane
2000s in Brisbane